The 1996 United States presidential election in Tennessee took place on November 5, 1996. All 50 states and the District of Columbia, were part of the 1996 United States presidential election. Tennessee voters chose 11 electors to the Electoral College, which selected the president and vice president. Tennessee was won by incumbent United States President Bill Clinton of Arkansas, who was running against Kansas Senator Bob Dole. Clinton ran a second time with former Tennessee Senator Al Gore as Vice President, and Dole ran with former New York Congressman Jack Kemp.

Tennessee weighed in for this election as 6.01 points more Republican than the national average. , this is the last time that the Democratic nominee carried Tennessee, as well as Montgomery County, Maury County, Carroll County, Weakley County, Obion County, McNairy County, Anderson County, Coffee County, Polk County, Putnam County, Sequatchie County, Morgan County, Fayette County, Cheatham County, Roane County, Lawrence County, Dyer County, Union County, Fentress County, Meigs County, and Moore County.

The presidential election of 1996 was a very multi-partisan election for Tennessee, with nearly seven percent of the electorate voting for third-party candidates. Most counties in Tennessee turned out for Clinton, including the highly populated Shelby County and Davidson County, by narrow margins. Both Shelby and Davidson counties have been consistently Democratic since the election of 1992. In his second bid for the presidency, independent candidate Ross Perot  received over five percent of the votes in Tennessee, and to pull in support nationally as the most popular third-party candidate to run for United States Presidency in recent times. Tennessee nonetheless showed Perot his worst performance out of any state.

Results

Results by county

See also
 Presidency of Bill Clinton

Notes

References

Tennessee
1996
1996 Tennessee elections